Joe Cairney (1956 – 2009) was a Scottish footballer, who played in the Scottish Football League for Airdrieonians and Kilmarnock.

Cairney was part of the Airdrieonians team that won the Spring Cup in 1976. He later emigrated to Australia, along with former teammate John McVeigh, and played for Brisbane City and Brisbane Lions.

References

1956 births
2009 deaths
Date of death missing
Scottish footballers
Airdrieonians F.C. (1878) players
Kilmarnock F.C. players
Scottish Football League players
Wishaw Juniors F.C. players
Scottish expatriate footballers
Expatriate soccer players in Australia
Scottish expatriate sportspeople in Australia
National Soccer League (Australia) players
Brisbane City FC players
Queensland Lions FC players
Association football forwards
Footballers from Coatbridge